The 2006 Copa Toyota Libertadores was the 47th edition of the Copa Libertadores, CONMEBOL's annual football club tournament. 38 teams from 11 football associations have taken part, starting with the first qualifying round played on 24 January 2006. Internacional, from Porto Alegre, Brazil, won this edition.

Qualified Teams

First stage

Teams in the Team #1 column played at home in the first leg.

  
|}

Matches

First leg

Second leg

Group stage
6 winners from the qualifying round and the 26 pre-qualified clubs are drawn into 8 groups of 4 teams each. The top 2 teams in each group will advance to the Libertadores Cup play-offs.

Tiebreakers, if necessary, are applied in the following order:
Cumulative goal difference.
Total goals scored.
Away goals scored.
Sorting

Group 1

Group 2

Group 3

Group 4

Group 5

Group 6

Group 7

Group 8

Knockout stages

The teams were seeded 1 to 8 (first placed teams of each group) and 9 to 16 (second placed teams of each group) and the ties were 1 vs 16, 2 vs 15, etc.

Qualified teams

Bracket

Round of 16

Quarter-finals

Semi-finals

Finals

Top goalscorers

See also
2006 FIFA Club World Cup
2007 Recopa Sudamericana

References

External links
Copa Libertadores 2006
Conmebol  - Official Site of the CONMEBOL, which organizes the Copa Libertadores. 

 
Copa Libertadores seasons
1